Madeleine Sophie Wickham, known by her pen name Sophie Kinsella, is an English author. The first two novels in her best-selling Shopaholic series, The Secret Dreamworld of a Shopaholic and Shopaholic Abroad, were adapted into the film Confessions of a Shopaholic (2009). Her books have sold over 40 million copies in more than 60 countries, and been translated into over 40 languages.

Early life
Madeleine Sophie Wickham is the eldest sister of fellow writers Gemma and Abigail Townley. She was educated at Putney High School, St Mary's School near Shaftesbury, Sherborne School for Girls, and New College, Oxford, where she initially studied Music, but after a year switched to Politics, Philosophy and Economics (PPE). She worked as a financial journalist (including for Pensions World) before turning to fiction.

Life and career
At the age of 24, Kinsella wrote her first novel, which was published when she was 26. The Tennis Party was immediately hailed as a success by critics and the public alike and became a top ten best-seller. She went on to publish six more novels as Madeleine Wickham: A Desirable Residence, Swimming Pool Sunday, The Gatecrasher, The Wedding Girl, Cocktails for Three and Sleeping Arrangements.

Wickham's first novel under the pseudonym Sophie Kinsella (taken from her middle name and her mother's maiden name) was submitted to her publishers anonymously and was enthusiastically received. She revealed her real identity for the first time when Can You Keep a Secret? was published in December 2003.

Kinsella is best known for writing the Shopaholic novels series of chick lit novels, which focus on the misadventures of Becky Bloomwood, a financial journalist who cannot manage her own finances. She is also known for her relationship with Luke. The series focuses on her obsession with shopping and its resulting complications for her life. The first two Shopaholic books were adapted into a film and released in February 2009.

The most recent addition to the Shopaholic series, "Shopaholic to the Rescue" was released on 22 October 2015; "Christmas Shopaholic" was released in October 2019. Her most recent standalone novels are "Love Your Life", "I Owe You One" (Feb 2019), My Not So Perfect Life and Surprise Me. In 2015, she branched into Young Adult writing with her first YA book, Finding Audrey, published in June 2015.

A musical adaptation of Kinsella's novel 'Sleeping Arrangements' by Chris Burgess was premiered on 17 April 2013 in London at the Landor Theatre.

Personal life
Kinsella lives in Dorset and London with her husband, Henry Wickham (whom she met in Oxford), who was previously headmaster of Lockers Park boys preparatory school and now manages her business affairs. They were married in 1991.

Bibliography

As Sophie Kinsella
The Shopaholic series
 The Secret Dreamworld of a Shopaholic (also titled Confessions of a Shopaholic) (2000)
 Shopaholic Abroad (also titled Shopaholic Takes Manhattan) (2001)
 Shopaholic Ties The Knot (2001)
 Shopaholic & Sister (2004)
 Shopaholic & Baby (2007)
 Mini Shopaholic (2010)
 Shopaholic to the Stars (2014)
  Shopaholic on Honeymoon (2014)
 Shopaholic to the Rescue (2015)
 Christmas Shopaholic (2019)

Standalone novels
 Can You Keep a Secret? (2003)
 The Undomestic Goddess (2005)
 Remember Me? (2008)
 Twenties Girl (2009)
 I've Got Your Number (2011)
 Wedding Night (2013)
 My Not So Perfect Life (2017)
 Surprise Me (2018)
 I Owe You One (2019)
 Love Your Life (2020)
 The Party Crasher (2021)

Other
 Girls Night In (2004) (an omnibus of novels, along with many authors including Meg Cabot and Jennifer Weiner)
 Finding Audrey (2015) (a young adult novel)
Fairy Mom and Me (2018) (an illustrated series for young readers)

As Madeleine Wickham
 The Tennis Party (1995) (re-released as 40 Love in 2011)
 A Desirable Residence (1996)
 Swimming Pool Sunday (1997)
 The Gatecrasher (1998)
 The Wedding Girl (1999)
 Cocktails for Three (2000)
 Sleeping Arrangements (2001)

References

External links

Sophie Kinsella at Random House Australia

 
Alumni of New College, Oxford
English women novelists
British chick lit writers
Living people
People educated at Putney High School
Writers from London
People educated at St Mary's School, Shaftesbury
1969 births
20th-century pseudonymous writers
21st-century pseudonymous writers
Pseudonymous women writers